The Ministry of Public Health and Family Welfare is a ministry in the Government of Maharashtra. Ministry looks after health policy.

The Ministry is headed by a cabinet level Minister. Tanaji Sawant is current Minister of Public Health and Family Welfare.

Head office

List of Cabinet Ministers

List of Ministers of State

List of Principal Secretary

Services
Ministry is responsible for providing free and affordable healthcare in Maharashtra.

Primary Health Services
Rural area in Maharashtra is covered by various health centers. 
1,811 Primary Health Centres (PHC)
One PHC for 30,000 populations in Non Tribal Area.
One PHC for 20,000 populations in Tribal Area.
One rural Hospital for every 4 to 5 Primary Health Centers.
10,580 Sub Centres
One Sub Centre for 5,000 population in Non Tribal Area. 
One Sub Centre for 3,000 population in Tribal Area. 
37 Ashramschool.

Secondary Health Services
Speciality services are provided at the district hospitals.
ICU 
SNCU Ward (Special Newborn Care Unit) 
Burn Ward
C.T. Scan
Psychiatric ward
Sonography Services
Trauma Care unit

Tertiary Health Services
Super specialty services are offered in selected hospitals and medical colleges.
Cardiology, Cardiovascular and cardiothoracic surgeries
Nephrology & Urology
Oncology and Chemotherapy Unit & Oncosurgeries

References

External links

Health in Maharashtra
Public health organisations based in India
Government ministries of Maharashtra
Subnational health ministries